Nork, sometimes called as Hin Nork (Old Nork), is a neighbourhood in the Armenian capital Yerevan. It is located in the Nork-Marash District.

References 

Populated places in Yerevan